Restrepia, abbreviated Rstp in horticultural trade, is a small genus of 50orchids in the orchid family (Orchidaceae), closely related to Pleurothallis. Named in honor of Don Jose Restrepo, it tends to be more showy than most other Pleurothallids. They are found primarily at higher altitudes in the cool, damp montane forests of the Andes and Venezuela, with some into Central America up to southern Mexico.

Description 

These tiny epiphytic and rarely lithophytic orchids lack pseudobulbs. The erect, thick, leathery leaf is elliptic-ovate in shape. The aerial roots seem like fine hairs.

The flowers develop one at a time at the base of the leaf. They are borne on a slender peduncle, originating from the base of the back of the leaf. The long dorsal sepal is erect and ends in a somewhat thicker club-shaped tip. They have fused lateral sepals (synsepals) which may be quite colorful : white, yellow, rose, purple, orange or tan with red, brown or purple overlaid frequently with contrasting reddish-purple spots or stripes.  The long, lateral petals equally end in a thickened club-shaped tip. The long lip is ovoid and  widest its apex. It shows the same variations in color and markings.

They are generally of tufted habit and white sheathed stems with fine papery bracts.   Under the right conditions, they can be in flower all year long. They propagate by spreading and forming new plantlets, called keikis, from the base of mature leaves.

Several species, such as Restrepia muscifera, are very variable in size, shape and color. No two populations are the same.

Species 
Three subgenera are recognized. 

Restrepia aberrans (Panama).
Restrepia antennifera : Antennae-carrying restrepia (W. South America to NW. Venezuela). 
Restrepia aristulifera (Venezuela).
Restrepia aspasicensium (Colombia to NW. Venezuela).
Restrepia brachypus : Short-column foot restrepia (W. South America to Venezuela).
Restrepia chameleon : Color-changing restrepia (Colombia).
Restrepia chocoensis : Chocó restrepia (Colombia).
Restrepia chrysoglossa (Colombia).
Restrepia citrina : Lemon-yellow restrepia (Colombia).
Restrepia cloesii (Peru).
Restrepia condorensis : Condor-like restrepia (SE. Ecuador).
Restrepia contorta : Twisted restrepia (W. South America).
Restrepia cuprea : Copper-colored restrepia (Colombia).
Restrepia cymbula (Ecuador).
Restrepia dodsonii : Dodson's restrepia (Ecuador).
Restrepia echinata (E. Colombia to Peru).
Restrepia echo (Colombia).
Restrepia elegans : Elegant restrepia (Colombia to NW. Venezuela).
Restrepia ephippium (Ecuador).
Restrepia escobariana (Colombia).
Restrepia falkenbergii : Falkenberg's restrepia (Colombia).
Restrepia flosculata : Small-flowered restrepia (Colombia to NW. Ecuador).
Restrepia guttulata : Small-spotted restrepia (Venezuela to Ecuador).
Restrepia howei :
Restrepia iris : Rainbow restrepia (SE. Ecuador).
Restrepia jesupiana (Venezuela).
Restrepia lansbergii (NW. Venezuela to NC. Peru).
Restrepia limbata (Colombia).
Restrepia mendozae (SE. Ecuador).
Restrepia metae (Colombia). 
Restrepia mohrii : Mohr's restrepia (Peru). 
Restrepia muscifera : Fly-carrying restrepia (S. Mexico to Ecuador).
Restrepia nittiorhyncha (Colombia).
Restrepia pandurata (Colombia).
Restrepia pelyx (Colombia).
Restrepia piperitosa (Peru).
Restrepia portillae (Ecuador).
Restrepia purpurea : Purple restrepia (Colombia).
Restrepia radulifera (Venezuela).
Restrepia renzii (Venezuela).
Restrepia roseola : Rosy restrepia (Venezuela).
Restrepia sanguinea : Blood red restrepia (Colombia).
Restrepia schizosepala (NE. Ecuador).
Restrepia seketii (Colombia).
Restrepia tabeae : Tabe's restrepia (Colombia).
Restrepia teaguei : Teague's restrepia (Ecuador).
Restrepia tentaculata - now synonym of Lindleyalis tentaculata (Poepp. & Endl.) Luer 2004
Restrepia trichoglossa : Hairy tongued restrepia (Mexico - Chiapas to Ecuador) 
Restrepia tsubotae (Colombia).
Restrepia vasquezii : Vasquez' restrepia (Bolivia).
Restrepia wageneri (NW. Venezuela).

Gallery

References

External links 
 
 
 Photos of Restrepia orchids

 
Epiphytic orchids
Pleurothallidinae genera